Sławęcin  is a village in the administrative district of Gmina Bieżuń, within Żuromin County, Masovian Voivodeship, in east-central Poland.

References

Villages in Żuromin County